Mastuj (Urdu: مستوج) is a city located in Upper Chitral District, Khyber Pakhtunkhwa, Pakistan.

History
Mastuj history dates back to the 1700s; later, the British founded this region and created Matsuj Fort to reside here.

Demographics
Khowar originated from this region.
Urdu is spoken as the national language.

Geography
This place is situated in Chitral, KPK., Pakistan, its geographical coordinates are 36° 17' 0" North, 72° 31' 0" East and its original name is Mastūj It has altitude of 2359 metres (7742 feet). There are ruins of old fort built originally in 18th century and reconstructed several times.

Climate
The climate is cold and temperate. In winter, there is much more rainfall in Mastuj than in summer. The Köppen-Geiger climate classification is Dsb. In Mastuj, the average annual temperature is -4.8 °C | 23.4 °F. Precipitation here is about 588 mm | 23.1 inch per year.

Educational institutions
University of Mastuj (under construction)
Aga Khan School, Mastuj
Govt Higher Secondary School Mastuj
Mastuj Model School
International Public School
Mastuj Institute of Computer Learning & Technical Education
CBS, Sorceh (Rech) Mastuj, Chitral
Maktab Primary School Lakhap Mastuj
GHSS Mastuj
Govt higher secondary school mastuj chitral
Government High School Chuinj
GOVERNMENT PRIMARY SCHOOL MASTUJ

See also
Khot
Buni
Mastuj Tehsil
Mastuj fort
Miragram

References

Chitral
Chitral District
Tehsils of Chitral District
Union councils of Khyber Pakhtunkhwa
Populated places in Chitral District
Union councils of Chitral District
Hill stations in Pakistan
Populated places along the Silk Road